The Orléans Masters championships is an open badminton tournament held in France. This tournament is organized by the Cercle Laïque des Tourelles Orléans (CLTO) Badminton and held in the Palais des Sports in Orléans.

This tournament began as a regional event in 1994, and later included as national event in 1999. In 2012, this tournament known as French International as a part of European circuit and sanctioned by the Badminton World Federation as International Series. The French International upgraded its level as International Challenge in 2013, and changed its name to Orléans International in 2015, to avoid confusion with the already established French Open held in Paris.

In June 2017, the Badminton World Federation has accepted the candidacy of CLTO to organized of a higher ranking tournament. Thus, from 2018 and for a period of four years, the Orléans International becomes the Orléans Masters and enters the very restricted circle of the 30 best badminton tournaments in the world as BWF Tour Super 100 level with a total prize money $65,000, equivalent to the old Grand Prix level tournaments prior to the World Tour. From 2023 onwards, this will be a Super 300 tournament.

Past winners

Performances

See also 
 French Open (badminton), a higher level badminton tournament also hosted by France.

Note

References

External links 

 Orleans Masters

 
Badminton tournaments in France
Annual sporting events in France
Recurring sporting events established in 1994
1994 establishments in France
Sport in Orléans